The 1938 Bulgarian Cup Final was the 1st final of the Bulgarian Cup (in this period the tournament was named Tsar's Cup), and was contested between FC 13 Sofia and Levski Ruse on 3 October 1938 at Yunak Stadium in Sofia. FC 13 won the final 3–0 (walkover).

Match

Details

See also
1937–38 Bulgarian National Football Division

References

Bulgarian Cup finals
Cup Final